The Finance Committee is a select committee of the House of Lords in the Parliament of the United Kingdom. It supports the House of Lords Commission on considering the expenditure on services based on the Estimate for the House of Lords.

As of January 2023, the members of the committee are as follows:

See also 
 List of Committees of the United Kingdom Parliament

References

Committees of the House of Lords